Jerry Wayne Taylor (October 9, 1937 – March 19, 2016) was an American politician and businessman.

Born in Rison, Arkansas, Taylor graduated from Rison High School in 1955. He then served in the United States Army. Taylor worked in heavy construction. He was the owned of Taylor Reality and Taylor Surveying Company in Pine Bluff, Arkansas. Taylor served on the Pine Bluff City Council and as Mayor of Pine Bluff. From 2001 to 2005, Taylor served in the Arkansas House of Representatives and was a Democrat. Taylor then served in the Arkansas State Senate from 2005 to 2013 and was the assistant president pro tempore. Taylor died in Benton, Arkansas.

Notes

1937 births
2016 deaths
Politicians from Pine Bluff, Arkansas
People from Rison, Arkansas
Businesspeople from Arkansas
Mayors of places in Arkansas
Arkansas city council members
Democratic Party members of the Arkansas House of Representatives
Democratic Party Arkansas state senators
20th-century American businesspeople